The men's 1500 metres event at the 1999 Pan American Games was held on July 30.

Results

References

Athletics at the 1999 Pan American Games
1999